Felix Anthony Nigro (1914–2007) was a pioneering scholar in public administration. He was included in the International Who's Who and was elected to the National Academy of Public Administration.

University studies
Felix Nigro did his undergraduate studies at the University of Wisconsin at Madison (1935), where he graduated Phi Beta Kappa, and earned his Ph.D. in Political Science from the same university in 1948.

Career
Nigro had a distinguished career working with the Federal National Youth Administration and other federal agencies. He worked extensively in Latin America, for private industry, the State Department and the United Nations, in Venezuela, Uruguay, El Salvador and Costa Rica. He twice held teaching positions at the University of Puerto Rico (1949-1951 and 1955-1956) 
After returning permanently to the United States in 1957, Professor Nigro taught at Southern Illinois University, San Diego State University and the University of Delaware, where he held the Charles P. Messick distinguished professorship. He joined the Political Science faculty at the University of Georgia in 1969.

Authorship
Nigro was the author of many articles and several of the most important textbooks in the field, Modern Public Administration (1965; through 7th Edition in 1989), Public Personnel Administration (1959), and The New Public Personnel Administration (1976; through 6th Edition in 2007). Starting with the second edition of the public administration textbook and the first edition of the ‘New’ personnel textbook, his co-author was his son, Lloyd G. Nigro – a distinguished public administration scholar in his own right.

Retirement
Nigro retired in 1982 as Professor Emeritus. The following three years he was Visiting Professor at Ryder College in Lawrenceville, New Jersey; from 1985 to 1992 he was a labor relations arbitrator building on his long-standing work in that field.

Personal life
Felix Anthony Nigro was born August 8, 1914 in Brooklyn, NY. He married Edna H. Nelson, and they had a daughter, Kirsten, and son, Llyod. 
Felix was an ardent fan of the New York and later San Francisco Giants.

He died, emeritus professor of political science at the University of Georgia, in Athens, Georgia, on September 5, 2007. He was 93 years old.

References

 "Felix A. Nigro" (by Thomas P. Lauth) in PS: Political Science and Politics, Vol. 41, No. 2 (Apr., 2008), p. 411.
 "Felix A. Nigro" in National Academy of Public Administration, 2007 Tributes
 Obituary Legacy.com

1914 births
2007 deaths
Public administration scholars
San Diego State University faculty
Southern Illinois University faculty
University of Delaware faculty
University of Georgia faculty
University of Puerto Rico faculty
University of Wisconsin–Madison College of Letters and Science alumni